The mixed doubles was a tennis event held as part of the Tennis at the 1920 Summer Olympics programme. It was the third appearance of the event. A total of 32 players (16 pairs) from 7 nations competed in the event, which was held from 17 to 24 August 1920 at the Beerschot Tennis Club. French pair Suzanne Lenglen and Max Decugis took gold, with British players Kathleen McKane Godfree and Max Woosnam earning silver and Czechoslovakia's Milada Skrbková and Ladislav Žemla winning bronze. It was the first victory for France in the event; Czechoslovakia earned its first mixed doubles medal in its event debut.

Background

This was the third appearance of mixed doubles tennis. The event was first held in 1900 and would not be held again until 1912 (when both outdoor and indoor versions were held); it would then be held the next two Games in 1920 and 1924. Tennis was not a medal sport from 1928 to 1984, though there were demonstration events in 1968 (which included mixed doubles) and 1984 (which did not). Mixed doubles did not return with the rest of the tennis programme in 1988; instead, it was not until 2012 that mixed doubles returned to the programme, where it has been since.

Suzanne Lenglen and Max Decugis had won the last French Championship before World War I (in 1914) and the first French Championship after the war (in 1920). Decugis had won multiple mixed doubles titles with other partners previously.

Belgium, Czechoslovakia, Denmark, and Italy each made their mixed doubles debut. France competed for the third time, the only nation to have competed at each previous edition.

Competition format

The competition was a single-elimination tournament with a bronze-medal match. All matches were best-of-three sets.

Schedule

Draw

Finals

Top half

Bottom half

References

Sources
 
 
  ITF, 2008 Olympic Tennis Event Media Guide

X=Mixed doubles
1920
Mixed events at the 1920 Summer Olympics